John Kinsella (born 1963) is an Australian poet, novelist, critic, essayist and editor. His writing is strongly influenced by landscape, and he espouses an 'international regionalism' in his approach to place. He has also frequently worked in collaboration with other writers, artists and musicians.

Early life and work
Kinsella was born in Perth, Western Australia. His mother was a poet and he began writing poetry as a child.  He cites Judith Wright among his early influences. Before becoming a full-time writer, teacher and editor he worked in a variety of places, including laboratories, a fertiliser factory and on farms.

Later poetry and writing
Kinsella has published over thirty books and his many awards include three Western Australian Premier's Book Awards, the Grace Leven Prize for Poetry, the John Bray Award for Poetry, and the 2008 Christopher Brennan Award.

His poems have appeared in journals such as Stand, The Times Literary Supplement, The Kenyon Review, Poetry Salzburg Review and Antipodes. His poetry collections include: Poems 1980-1994, The Silo, The Undertow: New & Selected Poems, Visitants (1999), Wheatlands (with Dorothy Hewett, 2000) and The Hierarchy of Sheep (2001). 
His book, Peripheral Light: New and Selected Poems, includes an introduction by Harold Bloom and his poetry collection, The New Arcadia, was published in June 2005.

Kinsella is a vegan and has written about the ethics of vegetarianism. In 2001 he published a book of autobiographical writing, called Auto. He has also written plays, short stories and the novels Genre and Post-colonial.

Kinsella teaches at Cambridge University, where he is a Fellow of Churchill College. Previously, he was Professor of English at Kenyon College, United States, where he was the Richard L Thomas Professor of Creative Writing in 2001.

Kinsella's manuscripts are housed in the University of Western Australia, the National Library of Australia, the University of New South Wales, Kenyon College and the University of Leeds. The main collection is in Special Collections in the University of Western Australia Library.

Kinsella's 2010 book, Activist Poetics: Anarchy in the Avon Valley, was published by Liverpool University Press and is edited by Niall Lucy.

Work as an editor and critic
Kinsella is a founding editor of the literary journal Salt and international editor of  The Kenyon Review. He co-edited a special issue on Australian poetry for the American journal Poetry and various other issues of international journals. He was a poetry critic for The Observer and is an editorial consultant for Westerly.

Bibliography

Poetry

Collections

List of poems

Novels
 
 Post-colonial (2009)
 Lucida Intervalla (2018)
 Hollow Earth (2019)
 Pushing Back (2021)

Short fiction 
Collections
 
 Conspiracies (2003)

Plays

Non-fiction
 
 
 
 
 
 
 
 
 
 
 

Autobiography / memoir
 
 

Essays and reporting
 

Miscellaneous

Interviews
"The Poetry Kit Interviews John Kinsella", 1998 
Overland literary journal, interviewed by Tracy Ryan, 24 November 2008

References

External links 
'X Marks the Parataxis: Louis Armand, John Kinsella and Jessica L. Wilkinson' in Cordite Poetry Review.
'John Kinsella's Poetics of Distraction' in Cordite Poetry Review.
Three poems.
Parrotology: On the Necessity of Parrots in Poetry essay by John Kinsella at the Australian Book Review.
'America' reviewed by Abena Sutherland in poetry mag "Intercapillary Space".
Mutually Said: Poets Vegan Anarchist Pacifist, the blog that he shares with Tracy Ryan.
soi 3 publicity page for Post-colonial.
 Audio: John Kinsella reads "Rapture: Tim Discovers the Cosmos" from the book Divine Comedy: Journeys Through A Regional Geography (via poemsoutloud.net)
"John Kinsella's Shades of the Sublime and Beautiful reviewed by Nicholas Pierpan" at Tower Magazine
Profile at Bloodaxe Books
Review of Armour in the Oxonian Review.

1963 births
Living people
Alumni of the University of Cambridge
Australian anarchists
Australian pacifists
Australian poets
Fellows of Churchill College, Cambridge
Kenyon College faculty
The New Yorker people
University of Western Australia alumni
Writers from Perth, Western Australia